Damir Fejzic (born April 16, 1994 in Vršac) is a Serbian taekwondo practitioner. At the 2012 Summer Olympics, he competed in the Men's 68 kg competition, reaching the quarterfinals.

References

Serbian male taekwondo practitioners
1994 births
Living people
Olympic taekwondo practitioners of Serbia
Taekwondo practitioners at the 2012 Summer Olympics
People from Vršac
Taekwondo practitioners at the 2015 European Games
European Games competitors for Serbia
Competitors at the 2018 Mediterranean Games
Mediterranean Games competitors for Serbia
21st-century Serbian people